The 1984–85 Washington State Cougars men's basketball team represented Washington State University for the 1984–85 NCAA Division I men's basketball season. Led by second-year head coach Len Stevens, the Cougars were members of the Pacific-10 Conference and played their home games on campus at Beasley Coliseum in Pullman, Washington.

There was no conference tournament this season; it debuted two years later.

References

External links
Sports Reference – Washington State Cougars: 1984–85 basketball season

Washington State Cougars men's basketball seasons
Washington State Cougars
Washington State
Washington State